Cartwright is an unincorporated rural community and census-designated place in Bryan County, Oklahoma, United States. As of the 2010 census it had a population of 609. The post office opened April 25, 1940, and it is one of the newest communities in Bryan County. The ZIP code is 74731.

It is named for Congressman Wilburn Cartwright. Cartwright was established because of the construction of Denison Dam when a community of shelters for workmen was erected.

Overview
In Cartwright for the years 2010–2014, the median household income is $27,212 and the median house value is $101,500. The median year that a house in Cartwright was built is 1983.

References

Further reading
Shirk, George H. Oklahoma Place Names. Norman: University of Oklahoma Press, 1987. .

Census-designated places in Bryan County, Oklahoma
Census-designated places in Oklahoma